The Pearl River Delta Ring Expressway, officially the Pearl River Delta Region Ring Expressway and designated G94, is an expressway in China, envisioned to encircle the Pearl River Delta region of Guangdong, Hong Kong and Macau. When complete, it will be  in length.

Sections of the expressway in Hong Kong and Macau are observed only by Mainland China. These special administrative regions have their own highway numbering systems. 

Currently, only sections between Zhuhai and Sanshui District and from Zengcheng to Shenzhen are complete, entirely in the province of Guangdong. 

The expressway ends at Meiguan Road and Beihuan Boulevard in Shenzhen, which is not near the border. Motorists must continue south along Huanggang Road to the Huanggang Port. There are no plans to connect the expressway directly to the border.

In Hong Kong, there are no plans to connect an expressway to the Shenzhen border. Hong Kong is not required to comply because it has its own highway system. Similarly, Macau is not required to comply and it is unknown if the Hong Kong and Macau sections will actually be expressways.

The expressway uses the Hong Kong-Zhuhai-Macau Bridge from Hong Kong to Macau and Zhuhai.

See also
 Transport in China

References

Chinese national-level expressways
Expressways in Guangdong
Pearl River Delta
Ring roads in China
Roads in Shenzhen